Jacco Eltingh and Paul Haarhuis defeated the defending champions Todd Woodbridge and Mark Woodforde in the final, 7–6(7–4), 7–6(7–5), 6–4 to win the doubles tennis title at the 1993 ATP Tour World Championships.

Draw

Finals

Group A
Standings are determined by: 1. number of wins; 2. number of matches; 3. in two-players-ties, head-to-head records; 4. in three-players-ties, percentage of sets won, or of games won; 5. steering-committee decision.

Group B
Standings are determined by: 1. number of wins; 2. number of matches; 3. in two-players-ties, head-to-head records; 4. in three-players-ties, percentage of sets won, or of games won; 5. steering-committee decision.

References
ATP Tour World Championships Doubles Draw

Doubles
Tennis tournaments in South Africa
1993 in South African tennis
Sports competitions in Johannesburg